Dale is a 2007 documentary film about the life and career of NASCAR race car driver Dale Earnhardt. The film follows his career all the way to his death in the 2001 Daytona 500. Produced as a collaboration between CMT Films and NASCAR Images, the film premiered in theaters in selected cities in February 2007. A lot of the cities the film premiered in were cities where the NASCAR Sprint Cup Series was racing that week including Daytona Beach. Dale made its television debut on CMT on September 4, 2007, setting a new ratings record for the network of more than 3.1 million total viewers. The film included interviews from legendary NASCAR drivers including Dale's rival Darrell Waltrip.  The film is now available on DVD as a 6-disc set. Narrated by Paul Newman, it was one of his last films and the final one to air in his lifetime.

References

External links
 
 

2007 documentary films
2007 films
Dale Earnhardt
American auto racing films
Documentary films about auto racing
Documentary films about sportspeople
NASCAR mass media
2000s English-language films
2000s American films